Digrammia curvata, the shaded granite, is a species of geometrid moth in the family Geometridae. It is found in Central America and North America.

The MONA number for Digrammia curvata is 910784 & Hodges number for Digrammia curvata is 6370.

References

Further reading

 
 
 
 
 
 
 
 
 
 

Macariini
Moths described in 1880